Cutervo National Park , established in 1961, is the oldest protected area in Peru. It is located in the northern Peruvian Andes, in the region of Cajamarca. Moreover, those areas are the habitat of animal species like the spectacled bear, the mountain tapir, and the oilbird; and plant species like the Andean wax palms.

History
Human occupation in the area dates back to the Pre-Columbian era. Archaeological remains are present inside the national park, primarily within the El Perolito Archaeological Site.

Following the 8th Pan-American Conference in 1938 held in Lima, the nature conservationist society Comité Nacional de Protección a la Naturaleza (National Committee of Nature Protection) was founded, which included the Federación Cultural de Cutervo-Lima (Cultural Federation of Cutervo in Lima). Federación Cultural de Cutervo-Lima submitted a project for a national park near Cutervo to the Ministry of Agriculture that was dismissed.

Biologist Salomon Vilchez Murga, as deputy for the region of Cajamarca, presented a project to the congress for the creation of Cutervo National Park, which passed as law 13694 on September 8, 1961, and took effect 12 days later on September 20. A proposal to increase the park area was submitted in 2000. Law 28860 expanded the area of the park to the current  on August 3, 2006. In 2007, a buffer zone surrounding the national park was created in order to diminish pressure and threats to the ecosystems inside the park.

Geography 
Cutervo National Park is located in the districts of San Andres de Cutervo, Santo Domingo de la Capilla, Callayuc, Santa Cruz de Cutervo, Pimpingos and Santo Tomas de Aquino; which belong to the Cutervo Province, within the region of Cajamarca.

The most prominent geographical feature, at the highest elevation in the park, is the mountain range Cordillera de Tarros. This mountain has several caves and is the origin of several streams. Elevations inside the park range between 1550 and 3500 meters above sea level.

Ecology
The park protects part of the Peruvian Yungas ecoregion. A variety of ecological communities exist within the park including wet montane forests, high-elevation grasslands above 3000 m, rivers, and small lakes.

Flora 
Over seven hundred species of vascular plants have been recorded in the park. Many are broadleaved trees (e.g.: Chionanthus pubescens, Cornus peruviana, Hedyosmum scabrum, Morus insignis, Ocotea arnottiana, Prunus integrifolia, Polylepis multijuga, Vallea stipularis, etc.), conifer (Podocarpus oleifolius) and palm trees (e.g.: Ceroxylon spp.).  Orchids are represented by 88 recorded morphospecies.

Fauna 
The park is home to mammal species facing risk of extinction such as the neotropical otter, the mountain tapir, the spectacled bear, the mountain paca, the giant anteater, and a species of  wild cat (Leopardus colocolo). Bird species like the oilbird, the golden-headed quetzal, and the Andean cock-of-the-rock are also live within the park. A species of catfish (Astroblepus rosei) can be seen in the underground streams of the caves inside the park.

Climate 
Forests in the area are covered by clouds and fog almost year-round. The temperature is between 

Recreation 
Camping and hiking are the most popular activities in the park, especially between July and October.

While there are several caves inside the park, the most visited by tourists are Gruta de los Guácharos (Oilbird Cave), Gruta Blanca (White Cave), and Gruta del Murciélago (Bats' Cave). Stalactites and stalagmites are present in all the caves. Some caves have underground streams home to the rare catfish species Astroblepus rosei.

The palm tree forests produce ample fruit that attracts oilbirds.

Páramo mountaintops have both grassland and lakes.

Environmental issues 
The main threats to the park's biodiversity are wood extraction and forest clearing for agriculture and pastures. A large issue is the rejection by some local inhabitants of the new park boundaries.

References

External links 
 Cutervo National Park. Official site (in Spanish)
 Cutervo National Park. Map.
Cutervo National Park. Profile at protectedplanet.net

National parks of Peru
Protected areas established in 1961
Geography of Cajamarca Region
Tourist attractions in Cajamarca Region